Jerico Antonio (born May 24, 1983), commonly known as Nico Antonio, is a Filipino actor, producer and singer.

Biography
Antonio is the eldest of four siblings, to Reynerio Antonio and Joji Alonso is a film producer. After graduating with a degree in European Studies from the Ateneo de Manila University, he pursued his law degree at the San Beda College of Law and eventually graduated from the San Sebastian College, as a working student. He completed his primary and secondary education also from the Ateneo. He has played various roles in several indie films and was a member of the defunct group Voizboys. He is married to Angel Garces on October 10, 2010, and they have two sons, Josiah born in 2012 and Jacob born in 2017.

Filmography

Television

Film
2004 – Minsan Pa
2006 – The Bet Collector
2007 – Baliw
2007 – Angels
2009 – Ang laro ng buhay ni Juan
2010 – My Amnesia Girl
2010 – Here Comes the Bride
2010 – Emir
2010 – I do
2010 – Magkakapatid
2011 – Amok
2011 – The Adventures of Pureza: Queen of the Riles
2012 – Captive
2012 – Amorosa
2012 – Posas
2012 – The Strangers
2013 – Tuhog
2013 – The Diplomat Hotel
2013 – If Only
2013 – Instant Mommy
2013 – Bendor
2013 – The Bit Player
2013 – Babagwa
2013 – Eyeball (short film)
2013 – My Little Bossings
2014 – Beauty in a Bottle
2014 – M: Mother's Maiden Name
2014 – Red
2014 – Hindi pa ako tulog Jose Alberto (short film)
2015 – Tandem
2015 – Waiting for Mr. Cabagnot (short film)
2015 – Beast
2015 – Walang Forever
2015 - Heneral Luna -as  Andres Bonifacio2016 – Echorsis2016 – Straight to the Heart2016 – My candidate2017 – Ilawod2017 – All of You2018 – Ang Dalawang Mrs. Reyes2018 – The Girl in the Orange Dress – Julio
2019 – Time & Again – Freddie
2019 – The Annulment 
2020 – Manila Gays 
2020 – Bully'Kang: Ang Mga Bestfriends Nating BullyProducer
2014 – Bwaya2016 – I America''

References

External links

1983 births
Living people
Filipino male television actors
Filipino film producers
21st-century Filipino male singers
Filipino Roman Catholics
People from Manila
San Sebastian College – Recoletos alumni
ABS-CBN personalities
GMA Network personalities